Alex Bars (born September 8, 1995) is an American football offensive guard for the Las Vegas Raiders of the National Football League (NFL). He played college football at Notre Dame and was originally signed as an undrafted free agent by the Chicago Bears following the 2019 NFL Draft.

College career
Bars was a member of the Notre Dame Fighting Irish for five seasons. He spent his freshman year on the scout team before playing in six games with two starts as a sophomore. He started all 12 of Notre Dame's games at right tackle as a junior and all 13 games of his senior year at left guard. Bars returned as a graduate student for a fifth season of NCAA eligibility and was named a preseason All-American by the Sporting News, but tore his MCL and ACL five games into the season against Stanford. Over the course of his college career, Bars played in 36 games with 32 starts.

Professional career

Chicago Bears
Bars signed with the Chicago Bears as an undrafted free agent on May 2, 2019. Bars was waived at the end of training camp during final roster cuts, but was re-signed to the team's practice squad on September 1, 2019. The Bears promoted Bars to the active roster on October 15, 2019. He made his NFL debut on November 28, 2019, against the Detroit Lions. A fun fact about Bars: he changed his number to 64 for his professional career as a tribute to his favorite childhood game “Concentration 64”. Bars played in five games during his rookie season.

Bars made his first career start on November 8, 2020, in a 17–24 loss to the Tennessee Titans, lining up at center despite having never played the position and playing all 77 of the Bears' offensive snaps. Bars played in all 16 regular season games and started the last eight with one start at center, one start at left guard and six starts at right guard. He signed a contract extension with the team on March 3, 2021.

Las Vegas Raiders
On March 27, 2022, Bars signed a one-year contract with the Las Vegas Raiders. He was waived on August 30, 2022. On September 6, 2022, Bars was signed to the practice squad.

Bars was elevated to the active roster on September 17, 2022, for the week 2' game against the Arizona Cardinals and on September 24, 2022, for the week 3' game against the Tennessee Titans and on both cases was then reverted to the practice squad the next day.

On October 1, 2022, the Raiders signed Bars to active roster from the practice squad.

References

External links
Las Vegas Raiders bio
Notre Dame Fighting Irish bio

1995 births
Living people
Players of American football from Nashville, Tennessee
American football offensive guards
Notre Dame Fighting Irish football players
Chicago Bears players
Las Vegas Raiders players